The 2015 Naiste Meistriliiga was the 23rd season of women's league football in Estonia.

The season was played between 4 April 2015, and 18 October 2015. The defending Champions were Pärnu JK, who successfully for the fifth year running defended their title. It is their 11th league title overall and gave them qualification to the 2016–17 UEFA Women's Champions League.

League clubs

The following clubs competed in the 2015 Naiste Meistriliiga season:

Format
The 8 teams play each other twice, for a total of 14 matches, with the top four teams qualifying for a championship round and the bottom four teams playing a relegation round.

Regular season

League table

Results

Final stage

Championship group
Points and goals in the second stage are just added to the first stage. Each team will end on 20 games.

Relegation Group

Top scorers

References

External links
Naised Expert Liga 2015 jalgpall.ee 
Meistrliiga Women (regular season) Soccerway

Estonia
Estonia
2015 in Estonian football
Naiste Meistriliiga